George Trenchard (c. 1548 – 24 November 1630), of Wolveton and later of Lytchett Matravers, Dorset, was an English politician.

He was a Member of Parliament (MP) for Dorset in 1584, Bridport in 1571 and Dorchester in 1572. His grandfather had been an associate of the 1st Earl of Bedford as commissioner for church goods in Dorset.

References

1548 births
1630 deaths
Members of the Parliament of England for Dorchester
Politicians from Dorset
English MPs 1571
English MPs 1572–1583
English MPs 1584–1585